Afrijet Airlines was an airline with its head office in the NAHCO Building on the grounds of Murtala Muhammed International Airport in Ikeja, Nigeria. It was established and started regional cargo operations in 1999. Its main base was Murtala Mohammed International Airport.

History
As well as operating cargo services from Nigeria, the airline also operated high-profile security flight operations in the Democratic Republic of Congo. The airline has since moved from its offices at Murtala Mohammed International Airport to its corporate headquarters in Opebi, Lagos. It still maintains an aviation maintenance shop with its sister company Elite Aviation.

The Nigerian government set a deadline of April 30, 2007 for all airlines operating in the country to re-capitalise or be grounded, in an effort to ensure better services and safety. The airline satisfied the Nigerian Civil Aviation Authority's criteria in terms of re-capitalization and was re-registered for operation. However, in 2009, Afrijet Airlines was shut down.

Fleet

The Afrijet Airlines fleet included the following aircraft (as of 20 October 2009):
3 MD-82

References

Defunct airlines of Nigeria
Airlines established in 1999
Airlines disestablished in 2009
Defunct companies based in Lagos
2009 disestablishments in Nigeria
Nigerian companies established in 1999